Conor James Washington (born 18 May 1992) is a professional footballer who plays as a striker for Rotherham United and the Northern Ireland national team.

Washington began his career in non-league football with St. Ives Town, joining Newport County for £5,000 in 2012. After helping them return to The Football League via the play-offs, he transferred to Peterborough United in January 2014. Two years later, he signed for Queens Park Rangers for an undisclosed fee. In 2018, after leaving by mutual consent, he joined Sheffield United. Washington moved to Scottish club Hearts in June 2019. After spending one season with Hearts, he signed for Charlton Athletic in August 2020.

Born in England, Washington qualified for Northern Ireland through a grandparent. He made his senior debut for the Northern Ireland national team in March 2016 and was chosen for their UEFA Euro 2016 squad.

Early and personal life
Born in Chatham, Kent, England, Washington was eligible to play for Scotland through his mother, and through a grandmother to play for Northern Ireland. After his parents moved to St Ives, Cambridgeshire during his childhood, he began to show his scoring capability by winning trophies as part of the Westfield Junior School squad. After leaving school, he was turned down for an apprenticeship by both Norwich City and Peterborough United. He subsequently worked as a postman for the Royal Mail, whilst developing his football as a striker for St. Ives Town, scoring 52 goals in 50 matches in the United Counties League, Premier Division.

Club career

Newport County
Washington joined Newport County on 1 October 2012 for a fee of £5,000, after being spotted by their manager Justin Edinburgh. He made his debut 26 days later in a 3–2 home loss to Woking, replacing Ben Swallow for the final nine minutes. The only goal of his 15 appearances in his first season was the game's only on 9 April 2013 against Braintree Town at Rodney Parade. Newport finished 3rd in the Conference Premier and reached the play-offs, though he was not selected in the matchday squad for the playoff final which Newport won 2–0 against Wrexham at Wembley Stadium to return to the Football League after a 25-year absence.

Washington made his Football League debut in League Two versus Accrington Stanley on 3 August 2013, and his League Cup debut in the first round at Brighton & Hove Albion three days later, scoring the third goal in Newport's 3–1 win. His first Football League goal came on 10 August in County's 3–1 reverse at Northampton Town.

Peterborough United
On 28 January 2014, Washington joined Peterborough United for an undisclosed fee, with Shaun Jeffers moving the other way as part of the deal. As part of the deal, Newport retained a 20% sell-on clause.

He made his debut for the Posh on 8 February, replacing Jack Payne for the final 17 minutes of a 2–1 win away to Leyton Orient. His first goal in League One came on 8 March, concluding a 4–2 victory over Crewe Alexandra at London Road; he assisted two further goals. Washington scored three more goals over the season, including two in a win of the same score at Shrewsbury Town on 26 April, and added another in the play-off semi-final defeat to Orient. He was however cup-tied for their victory in the 2013-14 Football League Trophy.

On 7 November 2015, Washington scored the first two goals of a 3–0 win away to Burton Albion in the first round of the FA Cup, and three weeks later he added his first professional hat-trick in a 4–0 victory at Scunthorpe United.

Queens Park Rangers
On 19 January 2016, Washington joined Queens Park Rangers on a three-and-a-half-year deal for an undisclosed fee that was reported to be between £2.5m and £3m. Four days later, he made his debut by replacing Junior Hoilett with seven minutes remaining in a 1–1 home draw against Wolverhampton Wanderers.

After failing to score a goal in his first season at Loftus Road, Washington scored his first goal for the club in extra time of a League Cup first round match at home to Swindon Town on 10 August 2016, putting his team 2–1 ahead. The game ended 2–2 and he scored in their 4–2 penalty shootout victory. On 1 October, he scored his first league goal for QPR, opening a 2–1 win at Fulham in a West London derby.

On 5 August 2017, in the first game of the new Championship season, Washington scored both goals in a 2–0 home win over Reading.

Sheffield United
On 31 August 2018, Washington left QPR after his contract was cancelled by mutual consent and joined fellow Championship club Sheffield United on a one-year contract. He made his debut for the club the following day as an 81st-minute substitute for Billy Sharp during a 4–1 home win against Aston Villa. He was released by Sheffield United at the end of the 2018–19 season.

Hearts
Washington signed a two-year contract with Scottish Premiership club Heart of Midlothian in June 2019. He made his debut on 12 July, playing the full 90 minutes of a Scottish League Cup 1–1 home draw with Dundee United. On 16 August he scored his first goal in the last 16 of the same competition, a penalty to win 2–1 at Motherwell; it was his first career goal since February 2018. Nine days later he scored his first Premiership goal, a consolation as Hearts lost 3–1 at champions Celtic. In September, he was ruled out for three months with a hamstring injury.

Charlton Athletic
On 13 August 2020, Washington joined League One club Charlton Athletic on a two-year deal. He scored on his debut for Charlton against Crewe Alexandra on 12 September 2020.

On 10 May 2022, it was confirmed that Washington would leave Charlton Athletic when his contract expired.

Rotherham United
On 27 May 2022, Washington signed for newly promoted Championship club Rotherham United on a two-year deal.

International career
Washington received his first call-up to the senior Northern Ireland squad on 16 March 2016 for friendlies against Wales and Slovenia; he had only been to the area once, for a Peterborough friendly. He made his debut against Wales on the 24th, and four days later he scored his first goal, the only one against Slovenia at Windsor Park. In June 2016 Washington was named in the Northern Ireland squad for the UEFA Euro 2016 tournament. He scored his first competitive goal in Northern Ireland's 2–0 home World Cup Qualifying victory over Norway on 26 March 2017, making it three goals in three starts for him at Windsor Park.

Career statistics

Club

International

As of match played 12 October 2021. Northern Ireland score listed first, score column indicates score after each Washington goal.

Honours
Sheffield United
EFL Championship runner-up: 2018–19

References

External links

1992 births
Living people
Sportspeople from Chatham, Kent
Footballers from Kent
English footballers
Northern Ireland international footballers
Association footballers from Northern Ireland
Association football forwards
St Ives Town F.C. players
Newport County A.F.C. players
Peterborough United F.C. players
Queens Park Rangers F.C. players
Sheffield United F.C. players
Heart of Midlothian F.C. players
Charlton Athletic F.C. players
Rotherham United F.C. players
National League (English football) players
English Football League players
Scottish Professional Football League players
UEFA Euro 2016 players
British postmen
English people of Scottish descent
English people of Northern Ireland descent